Geka (Mandarin: 各卡乡) is a township in Daocheng County, Garzê Tibetan Autonomous Prefecture, Sichuan, China. In 2010, Geka Township had a total population of 806: 396 males and 410 females: 174 aged under 14, 566 aged between 15 and 65 and 66 aged over 65.

References 

Township-level divisions of Sichuan